The Society Against Sexual Orientation Discrimination (SASOD) is a human rights organisation and movement working for equality and justice for all Guyanese. SASOD is committed to  eradicating discrimination on the grounds of sexuality, gender sexual orientation, gender identity and gender expression in Guyana, and supporting similar working in the Caribbean, Latin America, the Commonwealth, Global South and worldwide.

History 
In 2010 during its constitutional reform process, Guyana's Parliament voted to outlaw discrimination on the grounds of sexual orientation. The President of Guyana, Bharrat Jagdeo of the People's Progressive Party, refused to sign the amendment bill. In July 2013, again the amendment to the constitution protecting persons against discrimination on the grounds sexual orientation returned to Parliament and SASOD (initially Students Against Sexual Orientation Discrimination) was formed on June 7 in order to advocate for its adoption.

Advocacy and activities 

Following the rejection of the anti-discrimination amendment in 2022 on procedural grounds, SASOD broadened its advocacy of LGBT rights by starting an annual film festival dedicated to films highlighting homosexual and bisexual relationships.  Currently this is the only such film festival in the English speaking Caribbean.

Beginning in 2010, SASOD contributed to Guyana's Universal Periodic Review (UPR) by the United Nations (UN) Human Rights Council (HRC).  SASOD called for the elimination of laws that discriminate again same-sex relationships between consenting adults, as well as improving access to health care for LGBT persons.

Also in early 2010, SASOD along with four other plaintiffs, filed a lawsuit in the High Court of Guyana challenging the constitutionality of an anti-cross-dressing law.  Having been fined in February 2013 the plaintiffs along with SASOD, filed for redress and for the invalidation of Summary Jurisdiction (Offences) Act Chapter 8:02, Section 153(1)(xlvii), which criminalizes men wearing female attire.

In July 2012, SASOD along with partner organizations, submitted a shadow report to Convention on the Elimination of All Forms of Discrimination against Women (CEDAW) summarizing the discrimination and harassment experienced by lesbian bisexual, and transgender women in Guyana.  Later in January 2013, SASOD submitted a shadow report to the United Nations Committee on the Rights of the Child (CRC), highlighting the need for comprehensive sex and sexuality education in schools, access to sexual health information, and the end of discrimination and abuse based on sexual orientation and gender identity.

Criticisms 
Opposition to SASOD's activities and positions has frequently originated in the Guyananese religious community.  The Inter-Religious Organisation of Guyana has opposed the SASOD's annual film festival, "Painting the Spectrum," on the grounds that it promotes homosexual behavior among youth.  Other portions of the Guyanese religious community oppose SASOD's efforts to decriminalize homosexual and transgender behavior.  SASOD has also encountered considerable criticism from its attempt via a suit in the Supreme Court of Guyana to invalidate the portion of the legal code which prohibits cross-dressing, Summary Jurisdiction (Offences) Act Chapter 8:02, Section 153(1)(xlvii).
Although their funding was cut in early 2016.

See also 
LGBT rights in Guyana

References

External links 
 sasod.org.gy

Organisations based in Guyana
LGBT rights in Guyana
2003 establishments in Guyana
Organizations established in 2003